The Whitehorse Star is one of two newspapers in Whitehorse, Yukon, Canada. When founded in 1900 it appeared only once a week, and its progress to Monday through Friday publication occurred in fits and starts; it was issued twice a week for a time, and then three times a week in the 1960s and five times a week from around 1980 to 1982. In 1982, the paper changed to publishing three times a week. The paper returned to publishing five times a week in 1985 until 2019. It is presently an afternoon newspaper, usually available after 3 p.m.; its cover price is $1.00.

The Star'''s official motto, "Illegitimus non Carborundum''", is a Dog Latin aphorism meaning "You mustn't let the bastards grind you down". The motto is incorporated into the newspaper's logo, and is displayed on its website.

Flo Whyard, who has served as the Mayor of Whitehorse, is among the newspaper's former editors. The newspaper has been owned by Jackie Pierce since 2002.

References

External links

Newspapers published in Yukon
Mass media in Whitehorse
Newspapers established in 1900
Daily newspapers published in Canada
1900 establishments in Yukon